The White River is a tributary about  long, of the Yukon River in the U.S. state of Alaska and the Canadian territory of Yukon. The Alaska Highway crosses the White River near Beaver Creek.

The White River is glacier-fed and contains large amounts of suspended sediment. It transports 19 million tons of sediment per year in the upper part of its basin. This dramatically changes the clarity of the Yukon River, which remains sediment laden from the confluence to its mouth.

See also
List of rivers of Alaska
List of rivers of Yukon

References

International rivers of North America
Rivers of Alaska
Rivers of Copper River Census Area, Alaska
Rivers of Unorganized Borough, Alaska
Rivers of Yukon
Tributaries of the Yukon River